Clitocybe lohjaensis is a species of agaric fungus in the family Tricholomataceae. Found in northern Europe, it was described as new to science in 1969 by Finnish mycologist Harri Harmaja. Lohja, for which the species is named, is a town in southern Finland.

References

External links

lohjaensis
Fungi described in 1969
Fungi of Europe